Clayton railway station is located on the Pakenham and Cranbourne lines in Victoria, Australia. It serves the south-eastern Melbourne suburb of Clayton, and opened on 6 January 1880 as Clayton's Road. It was renamed Clayton on 6 July 1891.

Description

History
Opening on 6 January 1880, just over two years after the line from Oakleigh was extended to Dandenong, Clayton station, like the suburb itself, gets its name from the property Clayton Vale, owned by John Clayton in the 1860s and 1870s. The property was located near the present day station.

In 1967, the station was closed to goods traffic, with the goods siding abolished in the same year.

In 1971, boom barriers replaced interlocked gates at the former Clayton Road level crossing, which was located at the Up end of the station.

In 1998, Clayton was upgraded to a Premium Station.

In March 2014, the Victorian State Government announced a grade separation project to replace the Clayton Road level crossing, as well as the Centre Road level crossing, located nearby in the Down direction of the station. This included rebuilding a new Clayton station. In April 2018, the rebuilt station opened, and was built above ground level. It is located along one of the three sections of elevated rail that were built to replace nine level crossings between Caulfield and Dandenong. The station is accessible by escalators, lifts and stairs.

Platforms and services
Clayton has one elevated island platform with two faces. It is served by Pakenham and Cranbourne line trains, and by V/Line Traralgon and selected Bairnsdale line services.

Platform 1:
  all stations and limited express services to Flinders Street
  all stations and limited express services to Flinders Street
  V/Line services to Southern Cross (set down only)

Platform 2:
  all stations and limited express services to Pakenham
  all stations services to Cranbourne
  V/Line services to Traralgon, Sale (one Sunday morning service, pick up only) and Bairnsdale (one weekday service, pick up only)

Future services: In addition to the current services the Network Development Plan Metropolitan Rail proposes linking the Pakenham and Cranbourne lines to both the Sunbury line and under-construction Melbourne Airport rail link via the Metro Tunnel.
  express services to West Footscray and Sunbury (2025 onwards)
  express services to Melbourne Airport (2029 onwards)

Transport links
Ventura Bus Lines operates eight routes via Clayton station, under contract to Public Transport Victoria:
 : Westfield Southland – Waverley Gardens Shopping Centre
  : Middle Brighton station – Blackburn station
 : Oakleigh station – Westall station
 : to Box Hill station
 : to Westfield Southland
 : Moorabbin station – Parkmore Shopping Centre
  : to Dandenong station (Saturday and Sunday mornings only)
  : to Dandenong station (Saturday and Sunday mornings only)

Gallery

References

External links
 
 Melway map at street-directory.com.au

Premium Melbourne railway stations
Railway stations in Melbourne
Railway stations in Australia opened in 1880
Listed railway stations in Australia
Railway stations in the City of Monash